Volcano Rocks was once a candy produced in the United States by The Willy Wonka Candy Company throughout the 1970s and the 1980s.

They were solid pieces of sugar candy resembling multi-colored rocks like the colorful gravel found at the bottom of many fish bowls.

The container they were packaged in was the same as the original Tart 'n' Tinys and Nerds candies, which were made by the same company.  It had a top that had a tear-out panel and then a sliding hard paper lid which revealed the opening.

Volcano Rocks are no longer available and information on the original candy is scarce and often misleads some to believe Pop Rocks are a viable substitute.

See also
 List of confectionery brands

External images
 http://theimaginaryworld.com/twitter06.jpg

The Willy Wonka Candy Company brands